This is a list of defunct airlines of Jamaica.

See also
 List of airlines of Jamaica
 List of airports in Jamaica

References

Jamaica
Airlines
Airlines, defunct